KFK may refer to:
 Kristiansund FK, a Norwegian association football club from Kristiansund
 Kung Fu Kids, a Philippine produced live-action fantasy series
 German Wings, the ICAO code KFK
 ISO 639:kfk, the ISO 639 code for the Kinnauri language